Talarn Dam is a concrete gravity dam  on the Noguera Pallaresa River, a tributary of the Ebro River, north of Tremp near Lleida in Catalonia, Spain. The  dam is 206 meters long and 82 meters high and supplies a hydro-electric station with an output of 30 MW.

Construction of the dam began in 1913, a huge undertaking needing ten million cubic feet of concrete. It was part of a larger project to build  dams to store water in reservoirs to feed powerplants and to provide irrigation for farming.

See also

Gravity dam
List of dams and reservoirs in Catalonia

Notes

External links

The National Hydrological Plan
A vertiginous voyage in canoe through Noguera-Pallaresa’s River
Technical characteristics and capacity - Inland basins
Dam Basics

Dams in Spain
Hydroelectric power stations in Catalonia
Dams completed in 1916